The Coliseum Arena or Coliseum Auditorium was an arena at 401 North Roman Street in the Tulane/Gravier neighborhood of New Orleans. It was located at the corner of N. Roman St. and Conti St.

Venue
In early 1921, John Dillon, Frankie Edwards and Al Buja formed a boxing syndicate, Coliseum Incorporated, to develop an arena. On July 21, 1922, the 8,000-seat arena with capacity for 8,500 opened. The arena was modeled after the Milwaukee Auditorium and Madison Square Garden with unobstructed views. The total costs of the four-story steel-trussed white brick-sheathed building exceeded $100,000.

Events

Boxing
The first event at the arena was a boxing match between local fighter Martin Burke and Charlie Weinert. The arena held many boxing matches including fights featuring Jack Dempsey, Gene Tunney, Joe Brown, Joe Louis, Sugar Ray Robinson, Willie Pastrano and Ralph Dupas. The final boxing match at the arena was held on December 14, 1959.

Professional wrestling
Professional wrestling matches were held at the arena. Professional wrestler Gorgeous George appeared at the arena almost a dozen times in the early 1950s.

Other events
The Coliseum also hosted college and high school sports events, music performances and public lectures. Dr. Martin Luther King Jr. spoke at the arena in 1957.

Arena closing
The Coliseum Arena closed in 1960.

References

Boxing venues in New Orleans
Defunct boxing venues in the United States
Defunct sports venues in New Orleans
Demolished sports venues in Louisiana
Sports venues completed in 1922
1922 establishments in Louisiana
1960 disestablishments in Louisiana